The FIFA U-17 World Cup 2007, the twelfth edition of the tournament, was held in South Korea between 18 August and 9 September 2007. For this event, the number of teams had been expanded from 16 to 24, with the top two of each group and the four best third-place teams advancing to the Round of 16. Also, from now on, the confederation which produced the last champion, in this case CONCACAF, had an extra spot in the qualifying rounds.

Players born after 1 January 1990 could participate in this tournament.

Venues

Teams 

1.Teams that made their debut.

Match officials

Squads 
For a list of the squads see 2007 FIFA U-17 World Cup squads

Group stage

Group A

Group B

Group C

Group D

Group E

Group F

Ranking of third-placed teams

Knockout stages

Round of 16

Quarterfinals

Semifinals

Third place match

Final

Winners

Awards

Goalscorers

Final ranking

References

External links 
 FIFA U-17 World Cup Korea 2007, FIFA.com
 FIFA Technical Report

FIFA U-17 World Cup
International association football competitions hosted by South Korea
FIFA U-17 World Cup tournaments
2007 in South Korean football
August 2007 sports events in Asia
September 2007 sports events in Asia